Meristomeringina is a genus of flies in the family Stratiomyidae.

Species
Meristomeringina aka Woodley, 1987
Meristomeringina cholo Woodley, 1987
Meristomeringina combinata (Lindner, 1958)
Meristomeringina kontagora Woodley, 1987
Meristomeringina mimetes James, 1952
Meristomeringina praestigiator Woodley, 1987

References

Stratiomyidae
Brachycera genera
Diptera of Africa